Gérard Colin (born 3 March 1958) is a French ski jumper. He competed at the 1980 Winter Olympics and the 1984 Winter Olympics.

References

External links
 

1958 births
Living people
French male ski jumpers
Olympic ski jumpers of France
Ski jumpers at the 1980 Winter Olympics
Ski jumpers at the 1984 Winter Olympics
Sportspeople from Vosges (department)